Andrew Graham McBurney (November 13, 1817 – April 23, 1894) was an American Republican politician who served as the eighth lieutenant governor of Ohio from 1866 to 1868.

Biography
McBurney was born in 1815 near Montgomery, Ohio, and was the eldest son of James and Magdalen Falen McBurney. The family soon moved to Lebanon, Ohio, where McBurney finished his apprenticeship as a cabinet-maker in 1836.
He read law in 1840, and was admitted to the bar 1843. He became a law partner to Thomas Corwin.

Career
McBurney was a Democrat until the start of the Civil War, when he became a Republican.  In 1861 and 1863, he was elected to the Ohio Senate, representing the Second District (Butler and Warren counties) in the Fifty-fifth and Fifty-sixth General Assembly.

In 1865, he was elected Lieutenant Governor, serving one term. He was an elector on the Grant/Colfax ticket in 1868, but did not again participate in Politics. In 1871 he was co-counsel with Clement Vallandigham in a murder trial. He was the only witness to see Vallandigham accidentally shoot himself to death in the Golden Lamb Inn. He died 1894 in Lebanon. McBurney is buried in Lebanon.

References

External links

Lieutenant Governors of Ohio
1815 births
1894 deaths
People from Montgomery, Ohio
Ohio lawyers
Republican Party Ohio state senators
1868 United States presidential electors
19th-century American politicians
American lawyers admitted to the practice of law by reading law
People from Lebanon, Ohio
19th-century American lawyers